The Jameh Mosque of Arsanjan is related to the Safavid dynasty and is located in Arsanjan, Saadiya Avenue.

Sources 

Mosques in Iran
Mosque buildings with domes
National works of Iran
Arsanjan